Down to Earth is the fifth album from English progressive rock band Nektar. A snippet of the song "Show Me the Way" was featured in an episode from the first season of the sitcom The Jeffersons.

Track listing

Charts

Personnel
Roye Albrighton- guitar, lead vocals
Mick Brockett - lights
Allan "Taff" Freeman - keyboards, backing vocals
Ron Howden - drums, percussion
Derek "Mo" Moore - bass, backing vocals

Guests:
P. P. Arnold - backing vocals
Phil Brown - bass tuba
Robert Calvert - ringmaster
Ron Carthy - 2nd trumpet
Kenneth Cole - backing vocals
Steve Gregory - tenor saxophone
Butch Hudson - 1st trumpet
Chris Mercer - baritone & tenor saxophones
Chris Pyne - trombone
Stephen Wick - tuba
Dieter Dierks - special effects
Chipping Norton Mandies - choir (2-9)

Production
Produced By Peter Hauke & Nektar
Recorded & Engineered By Barry Hammond

References

External links
Down To Earth at TheNektarProject.com

Nektar albums
1974 albums